Thomas George Thomas, 1st Viscount Tonypandy,  (29 January 1909 – 22 September 1997) was a British politician who served as a member of parliament (MP) and Speaker of the House of Commons from 1976 to 1983. He was elected as a Labour MP.

Born in Port Talbot, South Wales, he initially worked as a teacher in both London and Cardiff. A MP from 1945 to 1983, he held office in Harold Wilson's 1964–1970 Labour administration, notably as Secretary of State for Wales from 1968 to 1970. As a junior minister at the Welsh Office, he was one of the first on the scene of the Aberfan disaster (21 October 1966), and was later involved in the controversial government decision to use money from the Aberfan Charity Fund to clear remaining National Coal Board waste tips from around the village.

In 1976 Thomas was elected Speaker, in which role the first broadcasting of parliamentary proceedings brought him unprecedented public attention. He is the most recent Speaker to have served as a government minister before becoming Speaker. He retired from Parliament in 1983 and was elevated to the peerage as  Viscount Tonypandy, of Rhondda in the County of Mid Glamorgan.

Early life and education
Thomas was born in Port Talbot, Glamorgan, the second son of Zachariah Thomas, a Welsh-speaking miner from Carmarthen, and Emma Jane Tilbury, daughter of a founder of the English Methodist Church in Tonypandy. He had two elder sisters, Ada May and Dolly, one elder brother Emrys and one younger brother Ivor. His father became a heavy drinker and the family were happy when he joined up at the start of the First World War. They were less pleased when Emma had to take her marriage certificate to court to prove she was Zachariah's wife and not the woman in Kent to whom he had allocated his soldier allowance. He never returned to South Wales and died of tuberculosis in 1925.

Thomas was raised by his mother in the village of Trealaw in South Wales, just across the Rhondda Fawr river from the town of Tonypandy. All four of his siblings left school at age 13. His two sisters went into domestic service, his elder brother went to work in a coal mine, and his younger brother worked in a shop. He attended Trealaw Boys' School where he passed the scholarship examination for Tonypandy Higher Grade School, later promoted to Tonypandy Secondary Grammar School. On leaving school Thomas became a pupil teacher, first in Trealaw and then in Fanshawe Crescent School, Dagenham, Essex, after which he did a two-year teacher-training course at University College, Southampton. He then worked as a teacher in both London and Cardiff.

Political career
Elected to Parliament in the Attlee landslide at the 1945 general election, Thomas held Cardiff Central between 1945 and 1950, and Cardiff West between 1950 and his retirement from the Commons at the 1983 general election. When the Labour Party came to power under Harold Wilson in 1964, Thomas was made joint Under-Secretary of State for the Home Department, In April 1966 he was appointed Minister of State for Wales, and was one of the first on the scene of the Aberfan disaster in October 1966.

Thomas initially showed sympathy to the people of the village, bereaved and devastated by the disaster, where a NCB colliery spoil tip, loosened by heavy rain, slid down a hillside and engulfed houses and a primary school. The disaster cost the lives of 144 people, 116 of them children at Pantglas Junior School. The villagers campaigned vigorously for the remaining tips to be removed. On 20 July 1968 Thomas addressed a meeting, at the Welsh Office in Cardiff, to discuss the tips. When Thomas refused to agree to their removal, an angry crowd of villagers, took the meeting over and dumped a sackful of slurry on the floor of the offices. Thomas fled into hiding, elsewhere in the building, but after a stand-off returned, to be roundly berated by the villagers. Thomas later announced that the tips would be removed.

Although having agreed to remove the spoil tips above Aberfan, Thomas was party to a decision by the Wilson Government to forcibly take £150,000 from the Aberfan charity fund – raised to help the victims of the disaster and their families – as part payment for the removal operation. Only after in 1997, 30 years after the disaster, was the money paid back to the charity fund by the newly appointed Secretary of State for Wales Ron Davies, who was quoted as saying:
"It was a wrong perpetrated by a previous government – a Labour Secretary of State. I regarded it as an embarrassment. It was a wrong that needed to be righted."

In early 1967 he became Minister of State for Commonwealth Affairs. As Secretary of State for Wales from 1968 to 1970 he presided over the investiture of the Prince of Wales at Caernarfon Castle in 1969. Thomas was fervently attached to the Royal Family and also strongly opposed to Plaid Cymru, and particularly to the Welsh Language Society.

In 1974 Thomas was elected Chairman of Ways and Means and Deputy Speaker of the House of Commons. Two years later he succeeded Selwyn Lloyd as Speaker of the House of Commons. The first broadcasting of parliamentary proceedings (although only the sound was broadcast until 1989, not live pictures) brought him unprecedented public attention, but he proved more impartial than party colleagues had expected. In July 1983 he retired and was raised to the peerage with a hereditary peerage as Viscount Tonypandy, of Rhondda in the County of Mid Glamorgan. This was the last creation of a Viscountcy in the UK; Willie Whitelaw, who is often cited as the last such creation received his in June 1983. Also in 1983 he was awarded the degree of Doctor of Laws (LLD) honoris causa by the University of Leeds.

In the House of Lords Thomas was an outspoken critic of the European Union and the Maastricht Treaty, and in a June 1993 debate, he endorsed Margaret Thatcher’s comments and defended her after Roy Jenkins had criticised her similar "extreme" views against further European sociopolitical integration.

Thomas's opposition to Welsh nationalism was finally expressed in hostility to the Blair government's devolution proposals of 1997. He was asked by Robert Hodge, son of Sir Julian Hodge, to be a member of the steering committee of the "Just Say No" campaign (which opposed devolution in 1997). Despite ailing from cancer, Thomas agreed to a ceremonial role and became president. Other known persons in the movement included Nick Bourne, David Davies (Monmouth MP) and Alun Cairns.

During that year, he also gave his very high-profile endorsement of Sir James Goldsmith's Referendum Party, believing that the European Union was compromising the sovereignty of Parliament. He also wrote the foreword to Adrian Hilton's book on this issue, The Principality and Power of Europe. Lord Tonypandy was later Chairman of the Bank of Wales between 1985 and 1991.

A portrait of Thomas in the robes of the Speaker is part of the Parliamentary Art Collection.

He was the subject of This Is Your Life in 1983 when he was surprised by Eamonn Andrews at London’s Royal Albert Hall, ahead of a charity concert for the National Children’s Home.

Personal life
After Lord Tonypandy's death, former Welsh Labour MP Leo Abse revealed that Thomas had been homosexual and had been blackmailed because of it. Abse, the MP who introduced the private member's bill which partially decriminalised homosexuality in Britain, discussed this incident in his book Tony Blair: The Man Behind the Smile. He said that Thomas had paid money to blackmailers to keep information related to his private life secret. Abse said that he had once lent Thomas £800 to pay off blackmailers, and had also provided advice when Thomas contracted a venereal disease from a rent boy. Abse wrote that, while being otherwise a tough and fearless politician, Thomas would "dangerously over-react and panic if there was the slightest sign of a crack in the thin ice upon which he skated all this life ... The slightest tremor of scandal ... reduced him to a jelly." He also explained that he had decided to reveal Thomas's sexuality because he thought that "the gifts he gave to the nation fundamentally arose because of, not despite, his sexual orientation", adding that he brought "a feminine sensibility and empathy" to politics.

Throughout his career Thomas remained a deeply religious man, and was a prominent member of the Methodist Church. He was a local preacher and former Vice-President of the Methodist Conference. Known by the nickname "Tommy Twice" (from his full name), his Welsh-accented cries of "Order! Order!" as Speaker were familiar to a generation of Britons.

Lord Tonypandy died in Cardiff on 22 September 1997. He was twice engaged to be married but he never did, so there was no heir to the viscountcy, which became extinct. He is buried at Trealaw Cemetery.

Allegations of sexual abuse

In July 2014, British media carried reports that the South Wales Police were investigating allegations that Thomas had sexually abused a boy aged nine in the late 1960s.   In March 2015, South Wales Police confirmed that they were investigating claims that he had been involved in child abuse. The probe ended in March 2017 with no action being taken.

Arms

Bibliography
George Thomas, Mr Speaker: The Memoirs of Viscount Tonypandy, Century, London (1985) 
My Wales, with photographs by Lord Snowdon, Guild Publishing, London (1986)

References

External links 
 
 George Thomas begins his day clip from 1969 BBC fly-on-the-wall documentary Welsh Office.

|-

1909 births
1997 deaths
20th-century Welsh politicians
Alumni of the University of Southampton
British Secretaries of State
LGBT members of the Parliament of the United Kingdom
Welsh LGBT politicians
Members of the Parliament of the United Kingdom for Cardiff constituencies
Members of the Privy Council of the United Kingdom
Methodist socialists
Ministers in the Wilson governments, 1964–1970
National Union of Teachers-sponsored MPs
People from Port Talbot
People from Trealaw
Secretaries of State for Wales
Speakers of the House of Commons of the United Kingdom
UK MPs 1945–1950
UK MPs 1950–1951
UK MPs 1951–1955
UK MPs 1955–1959
UK MPs 1959–1964
UK MPs 1964–1966
UK MPs 1966–1970
UK MPs 1970–1974
UK MPs 1974
UK MPs 1974–1979
UK MPs 1979–1983
UK MPs who were granted peerages
Viscounts created by Elizabeth II
Welsh Christian socialists
Welsh Labour Party MPs
Welsh Methodists
Welsh schoolteachers
Methodist local preachers
Deaths from cancer in Wales
British Eurosceptics